Y is a commune in the Somme department in Hauts-de-France in northern France.

Y bears the shortest place name in France, and one of the shortest in the world. The inhabitants call themselves Ypsilonien(ne)s, from the Greek letter Upsilon (Υ), which looks like the letter Y.

Geography

History
The district belonged to the Y family from Vermandois.

The village was caught up in the First World War. It was decorated by Croix de guerre 1914-1918 on 15 December 1920. The Church of Saint-Médard was rebuilt in 1921 after the destruction caused by the First World War.

Since 2002, the commune has been part of the community of communes of the Pays Hamois, which succeeded the district of Ham, created in 1960. Then on 1 Jan 2017, Pays Hamois and that of the Pays Neslois, merged.

Politics and administration 
The commune is located in the Arrondissement of Péronne in the Somme department of northern France. Since 1958, the commune has elected deputies from Somme's 5th constituency.

Since 1801, the commune has been a part of the Canton of Ham. During the 2014 cantonal redistribution in France, the boundaries of the canton were expanded from 19 to 67 communes.

List of mayors

Population
At the French Revolution the commune had 160 inhabitants; as of 2017 its legal population was  92 inhabitants.

See also
Communes of the Somme department
Saint-Remy-en-Bouzemont-Saint-Genest-et-Isson, a village in the Marne département and France's longest commune name.

References

External links

 Y on the Quid website 

Communes of Somme (department)